Sviatoslav III or Svyatoslav III may refer to:

 Sviatoslav III of Kiev (died in 1194)
 Svyatoslav III Igorevich (1176–1211)
 Sviatoslav III of Vladimir (1196–1252)